Pritchett may refer to:

People
 Aaron Pritchett (born 1970), Canadian country music singer
 Bill Pritchett (1921–2014), Australian public servant
 Chris Pritchett (born 1970), American baseball player
 Florence Pritchett (1920–1965), American fashion editor, journalist, and radio and TV personality
 Henry Smith Pritchett (1857–1939), American astronomer
 James Pritchett (actor) (1922–2011), American actor
 James Pritchett (footballer), football (soccer) player
 James Pigott Pritchett, York architect (1789-1868)
 James Pigott Pritchett junior, Darlington architect (1830-1911)
 John Pritchett (disambiguation)
 Kelvin Pritchett, American football player
 Lant Pritchett, American economist
 Matt Pritchett, British cartoonist
 Phil Pritchett, American musician
 Robert Taylor Pritchett (1828–1907), English gun manufacturer and artist
 Victor Sawdon Pritchett (1900–1997), British writer and critic
 Wendell Pritchett, American lawyer, legal scholar, professor, and university administrator

Places
 Pritchett, Colorado, U.S.